Sai Wan Ho Ferry Pier is a ferry pier near Lei King Wan in Sai Wan Ho, Hong Kong. It is near a bus terminus on the Grand Promenade. It has three ferry services to Kwun Tong, Sam Ka Tsuen and Tung Lung Chau. All ferry services are operated by Coral Sea Ferry.

The pier started operation in 1983, replacing the temporary Tai Koo Shing Ferry Pier.

Destinations

References

Piers in Hong Kong
Sai Wan Ho
Victoria Harbour